S. Abdul Hameed known by his pen name Manushya Puthiran (in Tamil: மனுஷ்ய புத்திரன்) (born 15 March 1968) is a poet and writer from  Tamil Nadu, India.

Early life and education 

Manushya Puthiran born as S Abdul Hameed, is the second of four children on 15 March 1968, in Thuvarankurichi, Tiruchirappalli District. He started his schooling at the age of 7 and he describes his early life:
"Started my schooling very late at the age of seven and I quit the school much earlier. This gave me ample time to see the fun around and dream. Having no constraints of fulfilling parent’s dreams , I drowned into my own dreams. My father and brothers brought books for me to kill the time. I reached an incredible world. On the whole, I was a pampered, spoiled useless but was growing as a Charismatic child. No much difference in that even now."

Completed his schooling in private, continued his first year degree in Bachelor of Arts through Distance Learning Programs, Annamalai University. Just not to miss the fun and experience of campus, from 2nd year onwards he started attending college. Later he did dual master's degree one in Mass Communication and other in History.

Literary career 
He began his literary career in early 1980s. At the  age of 16, his first poem got published. Several of his poems got published in popular Tamil Magazines like Ananda Vikatan, Kumudam, Kalki and Kalachuvadu. His political and topical columns are regular in Tamil periodicals such as Kungumam and Nakkheeran.

He is managing the Uyirmmai publication and Uyirmmai magazine.

Poetry 
Pulariyin Muththangal (2016)
 Oozhiyi thinangal(2015)
 Anniya Nilathup Pen (2014)
 Suriyanuku Arugil Oru Veedu (2013)
 Arundhappadatha Koppai (2013)
 Pasitha Pozhuthu (2011)
 Itharku Munbum Itharku Pinbum (2010)
 Adheethaththin Rusi (2009)
 Kadavuludan Piraarthithal(2007)
 Manalin Kathai(2005)
 Neeralaanathu (2001)
 Idamum Iruppum(1998) No
 En Padukkai Araiyil Yaaro Olinthirukkiraargal (1993)
 Manushyaputhiran Kavithaigal (1983)

Literary Collections 
 Nizhalgalodu Pesuvom (2014)
 Edhir Kural Part 4  – Kai Vitta Kolaik Kadavul (2013)
 Edhir Kural Part 3  – Kutramum Arasiyalum (2013)
 Edhir Kural Part 2 (2013)
 Nizhalgal Nadantha Paathai (2013)
 Dinosorgal Veliyerik Kondirukindrana (2013)
 Thondramarutha Deivam (2013)
 Edhir Kural Part 1 (2013)
 Enna Mathiriyana Kalathil Vaazhkirom (2009)
 Kaathiruntha Velaiyil (2003)
 Eppothum Vaalum Kodai (2003)

Other Literary Activities

Sujatha Awards for Literary Excellence 

Sujatha Awards for Literary Excellence

In the year 2010 Uyirmmai Padhippagam and the Sujatha Trust together organized a commemorative function at the New Woodlands Hotel in Chennai on Saturday, 27 February, the second death anniversary of Tamil literature icon Sujatha.

At the function, it was announced that the Sujatha Awards for excellence in literature would be given away every year in memory of the great writer. The awards will be given away in 6 categories, namely Best compilation of

 Short stories
 Poetry
 Collection of articles
 Novel
 Best Little Magazine
 Best Website

The awards ceremony will be held on 27 Feb every year. The award will consist of a cash prize of Rs. 10000 and a citation.

Awards 

 Sanscrithi Sammaan(2002) – Indian Govt award for Young Poets.
 Ilakkiya Sirpi award by American Ilayakkiya Nanbarkal Kuzhi 2003.
 The Indian Ministry of Social Justice awarded him with the "Best Individual Creativity" in the year 2004.
 Received the poetry award from The Tamil Literary Garden, Canada for 'Adheethathin Rusi'
 Manushya Puthiran was chosen as one of top 10 influential people of Tamil Nadu by India Today's for the year 2011 and 2010.
 For his Adheethathin Rusi poem collection, Manushya Puthiran has been awarded by Canada Tamil Ilakkiya Thottam, in the year 2011.The Tamil Literary Garden

Political career 
On 19 Aug 2015, he joined the Dravida Munnetra Kazhagam. He is one of the 2 Advisors to the DMK IT Wing

Posts 
In January 2023, he was appointed as the president of Chennai Municipal Library Commission.

Views 
He is known for his progressive views on various socio-political issues like abolition of capital punishment, caste annihilation, and women's liberation.

Controversies 
In 2018, Manushyaputhiran and H.Raja were involved in a war of words due to a poem written by the former. Several writers then voiced their supports to Manushyaputhiran.

References 

 http://india.poetryinternationalweb.org/piw_cms/cms/cms_module/index.php?obj_id=2729
 http://tamil.thehindu.com/tamilnadu/%E0%AE%A4%E0%AE%BF%E0%AE%AE%E0%AF%81%E0%AE%95%E0%AE%B5%E0%AE%BF%E0%AE%B2%E0%AF%8D-%E0%AE%87%E0%AE%A3%E0%AF%88%E0%AE%A8%E0%AF%8D%E0%AE%A4%E0%AE%BE%E0%AE%B0%E0%AF%8D-%E0%AE%95%E0%AE%B5%E0%AE%BF%E0%AE%9E%E0%AE%B0%E0%AF%8D-%E0%AE%AE%E0%AE%A9%E0%AF%81%E0%AE%B7%E0%AF%8D%E0%AE%AF%E0%AE%AA%E0%AF%81%E0%AE%A4%E0%AF%8D%E0%AE%A4%E0%AE%BF%E0%AE%B0%E0%AE%A9%E0%AF%8D/article7557296.ece

External links 
Uyirmmai website
Uyirmmai Blog
ManusyaPuthiran Website

Tamil poets
Living people
1968 births
People from Tiruchirappalli district